Peterson Creek is a stream in the U.S. state of Wisconsin. It is a tributary to the South Branch Little Wolf River.

Peterson Creek was named after A. G. Peterson, a local landowner.

References

Rivers of Wisconsin
Rivers of Portage County, Wisconsin
Rivers of Waupaca County, Wisconsin